His Guardian Auto is a 1915 American short silent comedy film, directed by Arthur Ellery and Jack Harvey for the Thanhouser Company. It stars James Cruze, Ethyle Cooke, and Marguerite Snow.

References

External links
His Guardian Auto at the Internet Movie Database

1915 films
American silent short films
Silent American comedy films
1915 comedy films
Films directed by Jack Harvey
Thanhouser Company films
1915 short films
American black-and-white films
American comedy short films
1910s American films